San Giovanni is a village in Tuscany, central Italy, administratively a frazione of the comune of Portoferraio, province of Livorno. At the time of the 2011 census its population was 695.

San Giovanni is located on the Elba Island about 3 km east from Portoferraio.

Bibliography 
 

Frazioni of Portoferraio